The Agent is a 1922 American silent comedy film featuring Oliver Hardy.

Cast
 Larry Semon as Federal Agent
 Lucille Carlisle as Federal Agent, Undercover
 Oliver Hardy as Don Fusiloil (credited as Babe Hardy)
 Al Thompson
 Kittie Rinehart
 William Hauber
 Robert McKenzie
 Harry DeRoy
 Alfred Wertz
 Dan Maines
 Joe Rock as Bit Role (uncredited)

See also
 List of American films of 1922
 Oliver Hardy filmography

External links

1922 films
1922 comedy films
1922 short films
American silent short films
American black-and-white films
Films directed by Tom Buckingham
Films directed by Larry Semon
Silent American comedy films
1920s American films